Jonathan Owens (born July 22, 1995) is an American football safety for the Houston Texans of the National Football League (NFL). He played college football at Missouri Western.

Early life
Owens played high school football at Christian Brothers College (CBC) under Coach Scott Pingel after attending middle school at Loyola Academy of St. Louis. During his high school career, Owens won CBC Linebacker of the Year.

College career
After the end of his redshirt year during the 2013 season, Owens played defensive back for Missouri Western State University (MWSU). During his final season in 2017, Owens was MWSU Male Student-Athlete of the Year. During the 2017 season, Owens was also part of the All-Mid-America Intercollegiate Athletics Association (MIAA) Second-team. Owens was on the MIAA Academic Honor Roll throughout the course of his college career. He majored in pre-physical therapy with the goal of becoming a doctor.

Professional career

Arizona Cardinals
Owens signed with the Arizona Cardinals as an undrafted free agent following the 2018 NFL Draft. During the last week of organized team activities (OTAs) before the 2018 season, Owens was waived due to an injury, and spent the entire season on injured reserve.

On August 31, 2019, Owens was waived by the Cardinals.

Houston Texans
On September 30, 2019, Owens was signed to the Houston Texans practice squad. He was promoted to the active roster on November 21, 2019, but waived two days later and re-signed to the practice squad. He signed a reserve/future contract with the Texans on January 13, 2020.

On September 5, 2020, Owens was waived by the Texans and signed to the practice squad the next day. He was elevated to the active roster on October 10 and October 17 for the team's weeks 5 and 6 games against the Jacksonville Jaguars and Tennessee Titans, and reverted to the practice squad after each game. On December 12, 2020, Owens was signed to the active roster.

On August 31, 2021, Owens was waived by the Texans and re-signed to the practice squad. He was promoted to the active roster on December 4. On December 9, the Texans signed Owens to a two-year, $1.175 million deal that runs through the 2022 season. On December 26, 2021, Owens had his first career interception and first fumble recovery in the Texans' upset win over the Los Angeles Chargers.  On January 3, 2022, Owens was placed on injured reserve after suffering a dislocated wrist in the team's week 16 loss against the San Francisco 49ers.

Personal life

Owens credits his sister with getting him to start playing football.

He and USA gymnast Simone Biles announced their engagement on February 15, 2022.

References

External links
Arizona Cardinals bio
Missouri Western bio

1995 births
Living people
Arizona Cardinals players
Houston Texans players
Missouri Western Griffons football players
Players of American football from St. Louis